Sandra Suh is an American aid worker deported from North Korea in 2015 on charges of "using her humanitarian status as a cover to gather and produce anti-Pyongyang propaganda."

Humanitarian Efforts
In 1989, Suh founded a California-based organization, Wheat Mission Ministries. In 2005, Wheat Mission Ministries formally established itself as a non-profit organization. The organization provides food aid and medical technology to North Korea. The Korean Central News Agency said that Suh had frequently visited North Korea over the past 20 years.

Deportation 
On 8 April 2015, Suh was deported "on charges of using her humanitarian status as a cover to gather and produce anti-Pyongyang propaganda", visiting "under the pretense of humanitarianism", and "secretly taken photos and produced videos that had then been used as "propaganda abroad". KCNA said "the decision to deport rather than detain her had been made "taking into full consideration her old age"".

, US Department of State spokeswoman Marie Harf could not tell why Suh was deported.

See also

List of Americans detained by North Korea

References

Living people
2015 in North Korea
American Protestant missionaries
Female Christian missionaries
American people imprisoned abroad
Date of birth missing (living people)
People from California
Place of birth missing (living people)
Prisoners and detainees of North Korea
South Korean emigrants to the United States
People deported from North Korea
Year of birth missing (living people)